This is a list of mayors of Minneapolis, Minnesota. The current mayor is Jacob Frey (DFL).

Minneapolis
From 1867 to 1878 mayors were elected for a 1-year term. Beginning in 1878 the term was extended to 2 years.

As the city became larger and more complex, expectations of voters for mayors increased. The term was extended to 4 years beginning in January 1982, to provide mayors with more time to achieve their programs.

List

Timeline

St. Anthony
Minneapolis merged with St. Anthony in 1872.

References

Tony L. Hill, "Mayors of Minneapolis Since Incorporation," 1986.
Ray Marshall, "Who Governed - In Minneapolis and St. Paul," 1968.
Proceedings of the City Council of St. Anthony, 1855-1862.
Proceedings of the City Council of St. Anthony, Sept. 7, 1863-April 8, 1872.

Minneapolis